This article lists the notable hotels in Bengaluru, India.

List of completed hotels

See also
 List of hotels in India

References

Hotels in Bangalore
B
H
B